Mark Thompson is a Jamaican Olympic hurdler. He represented his country in the men's 400 metres hurdles at the 1992 Summer Olympics. His time was a DQ in the qualifiers.

He is married to the Bahamian former sprinter Pauline Davis-Thompson.

References

1967 births
Living people
Jamaican male hurdlers
Olympic athletes of Jamaica
Athletes (track and field) at the 1991 Pan American Games
Athletes (track and field) at the 1992 Summer Olympics
Pan American Games competitors for Jamaica